C677T or rs1801133 is a genetic variation—a single nucleotide polymorphism (SNP)—in the MTHFR gene.

Among Americans the frequency of T-homozygosity ranges from 1% or less among people of sub-Saharan African descent to 20% or more among Italians and Hispanics.

It has been related to
 schizophrenia
 Alzheimer's disease
 depression
 autism
 spina bifida.

In 2000 association studies on oral clefts, Down syndrome, and fetal anticonvulsant syndrome were either unreplicated or had yielded conflicting results.

Related genetic variants 
A1298C is a SNP in the same gene.
Studies have investigated the combined effect of C677T and A1298C.

References 

SNPs on chromosome 1